Titanic is a 1915 Italian silent film directed by Pier Angelo Mazzolotti and starring Mario Bonnard, Giovanni Casaleggio and Pierino Chiesa. Despite its title, the film is not about the Sinking of the RMS Titanic but about the discovery of a mineral of the same name.

Cast
 Mario Bonnard
 Giovanni Casaleggio
 Pierino Chiesa
 Elide De Sevres
 Luigi Duse
 Felice Metellio

References

Bibliography 
 Bottomore, Stephen. The Titanic and Silent Cinema. The Projection Box, 2000.

External links 
 

1915 films
Italian silent films
1910s Italian-language films
Films directed by Pier Angelo Mazzolotti
Italian black-and-white films